Marietta Subong (born August 27, 1970), known professionally as Pokwang, is a Filipino comedian, actress, television host and singer.

She started in a reality show on ABS-CBN and subsequently appeared in dramas and sitcoms of the network. She also received the Best Comedy Actress award from the Philippine Movie Press Club for her portrayal in the sitcom Aalog-Alog and the Best Female Comedian award from People's Choice Awards. She became a host of the variety shows Wowowee, Pilipinas Win na Win and Happy Yipee Yehey.

Early life
Pokwang was born as Marietta Subong on August 27, 1970 in Iloilo City. Her family hails from Antipolo, Rizal. Her father was a drunkard and her mother had difficulties in raising Pokwang and her 11 other siblings. Pokwang was the seventh born among her siblings.

Career

As a migrant worker
In 1990, Pokwang went to Japan as an Overseas Filipino Worker (OFW) and worked as a group dancer, going home to the Philippines four times within the two years time she worked in Japan. Her contracts in Japan were for six-months each. She saved money to renovate her family's fragile house to one made with sturdier materials. Pokwang also learned how to speak Japanese due to her work. She stopped working in Japan after she got pregnant which was also the time when Japan started to impose stricter regulations after following an issue with OFWs in Japan.

Pokwang went to Abu Dhabi in the United Arab Emirates to work as a domestic worker in 1998 after the gulf country started to accept OFWs. She worked in the country for six months. She wanted to go home immediately after she learned that her son who was then five years old was diagnosed with a brain tumor but her employer did not want to finance her plane ticket to fly back to the Philippines as she was still under contract. She was then forced to stay to raise funds herself. Her son later died while she was still in Abu Dhabi.

Return to the Philippines
Following the loss of her son, Pokwang decided to stay in the Philippines and tend to her daughter. Pokwang made her first appearance as a backup dancer in Eezy Dancing of ABC 5.

While performing as a guest in a comedy bar in Cubao, she met Eric Nicolas who was looking for a talent to work with ABS-CBN. She worked in a comedy bar named Funline and in 2002 moved to the Music Box. In 2004, Pokwang joined "Clown in a Million" a reality talent show segment of Yes Yes Show of ABS-CBN after she was convinced by Nicolas to participate and became the grand champion. After winning, she secured an exclusive artist contract with ABS-CBN.

Pokwang appeared in various dramas and sitcoms following her win at the reality talent show segment. She also had concerts both outside and within the Philippines and also had appeared in noon-time shows. She starred with other actors and actresses in various projects such as Dolphy which she considers her idol, Ai-Ai de las Alas, Willie Rivellame, Piolo Pascual, Sam Milby, Claudine Barretto, Judy Ann Santos, Sharon Cuneta, and Kris Aquino.

She won the Best Comedy Actress award by the Philippine Movie Press Club for her portrayal in Aalog-Alog and the she garnered the Best Female Comedian award of the People's Choice Award. As a film actress she won the Bert Marcelo Lifetime Achievement Award twice.

Pokwang appeared in various films portraying supporting characters. Her first film where she portrayed a lead role was the 2011 film A Mother's Story, where she took up a role of an overseas Filipino worker named Medy.

In 2020, following the denial of ABS-CBN's franchise renewal, she signed to APT Entertainment and hosted two blocktime shows produced by APT, Chika, Besh! and Fill in the Bank. being aired on TV5.

In 2021, Pokwang officially signed up with Sparkle GMA Artist Center after weeks of speculation of her transfer to GMA Network.

Comedic style
Pokwang prefers to use herself as a subject of her jokes rather than other people. She does not use "green jokes" (Filipino parlance for sexual innuendos) or devise other jokes more fit for a mature audience as she enjoys having children part of her audience.

Pokwang has also impersonated other people as part of her job as a comedian. Among the people she has impersonated were Dionisia Pacquiao such as for an episode in Banana Split and Anabelle Rama.

Personal life
In 1993, Pokwang married a Japanese national who she had met while she was working abroad in Japan. The union had a son, who later died due to a congential brain ailment. The couple had become estranged for over a decade. In 2009, after 16 years, Subong's ex-husband contacted her in an effort to reconcile after he found out he had cancer. He also requested to view the grave of his son, to which Pokwang replied "He has forgiven you, he's an angel now.".

In 1996, she entered into another relationship again with a Japanese partner. Though they did not marry, the union had a daughter, Ria Mae (born 1996). Pokwang has since not spoken to her daughter's father, but harbors no ill will toward him, stating she is open to her daughter one days meeting with him. He found out about Pokwang's celebrity status via mutual friend and through international media channels. In May 2014, Pokwang re-established contact with Ria Mae's father, who had since married and started a family, in an effort to have him appear at her debutante ball for her 18th birthday.

Pokwang had a British suitor but in June 2013 it was reported that he decided not to pursue. Pokwang speculated that the reason for this was that she was "playing hard to get", but insists that she remains friends with the Briton.

On 20 January 2015, Pokwang entered into a relationship with American actor Lee O'Brian, whom she worked with in the film Edsa Woolworth which was released in theaters in that same month. Subong became pregnant, but miscarried after three weeks. By September 2016, Subong had been introduced to O'Brian's relatives and the two began talking about marriage. Nuptial planning was delayed as Pokwang's priority at the time was her project Till I Met You. On June 16, 2017, Subong announced on Twitter that she was seven weeks pregnant with O'Brian's child.

On 18 January 2018, Pokwang gave birth to her third child and her first with O'Brian, Malia, in Antipolo. Pokwang and O'Brien separated in November 2021, with Pokwang having custody over Malia.

Filmography

Television

Films

Discography

Albums

Singles
Compilation album

Awards and nominations

References

External links
 
 Sparkle GMA Artist Center profile

1970 births
Living people
Filipino film actresses
Filipino television actresses
Filipino television personalities
Filipino women comedians
People from Iloilo City
Actresses from Iloilo
People from Antipolo
Filipino expatriates in Japan
Filipino expatriates in the United Arab Emirates
Visayan people
Star Magic
ABS-CBN personalities
GMA Network personalities
TV5 (Philippine TV network) personalities
Filipino women pop singers
Filipino television variety show hosts